In early 2018 there were eight known impact craters in Sweden. They range in age from 90 mya to 470 mya, and in diameter from 1 km to 52 km. Six of them are exposed, that is they are visible at the surface, in the natural landscape, although their nature and origin might need to be pointed out to the untrained layman.

List
 Dellen
 Granby crater
 Hummeln structure
 Lockne crater
 Målingen Crater
 Mien (lake)
 Siljan Ring
 Tvären

See also
 Ordovician meteor event

References

 
Geology of Sweden
Landforms of Sweden